Pirogi may refer to:
Pierogi, English name for East-European dumplings
Pirog, Russian word for "pie" (singular form)
Pyrih, Ukrainian for "pie"